Bosnia and Herzegovina competed at the 2013 World Championships in Athletics in Moscow, Russia, from 10–18 August 2013.
Bosnia and Herzegovina were represented by 2 athletes.

Results

Men
Field events

See also
 Bosnia and Herzegovina at the World Championships in Athletics

References

External links
IAAF World Championships – Bosnia and Herzegovina

Nations at the 2013 World Championships in Athletics
World Championships in Athletics
2013